Uno Edmund Lindbäck (11 January 1891 – 8 January 1970) was a Finnish footballer who played for HIFK Helsinki.

Lindbäck was the first player to score for the Finland national football team. He shot the opening goal in Finland's first international on 22 October 1911 against Sweden at the Eläintarha Stadium, Helsinki.

References 

1891 births
1970 deaths
Finnish footballers
Finland international footballers
Association football forwards
HIFK Fotboll players